Flicka 2 is a 2010 American direct-to-DVD family film and a sequel to Flicka (2006). The film is about a city girl who finds herself in the country not by choice and befriends a horse. Neither girl or horse are wanted and they find a common bond. The film stars Patrick Warburton, Tammin Sursok and Clint Black.

Plot
After the death of her mother, Carrie McLaughlin (Tammin Sursok) has been living with her grandmother in Pittsburgh, Pennsylvania. When her grandmother needs to go to a nursing home, Carrie has to move in with her father Hank (Patrick Warburton), a rancher in Wyoming, whom she hasn't seen since she was a baby.

Initially reluctant to adapt to country living, Carrie soon meets Flicka, a beautiful black Mustang that previously had belonged to Carrie's cousin Katy (Alison Lohman), who asked Hank to look after Flicka when her father sold their own ranch. Flicka is wild and dangerous and, according to the ranchers, longs for Katy. However, when Carrie is attacked by a prairie rattlesnake, Flicka saves her and the two form a bond. Carrie also meets Jake (Reilly Dolman), an attractive ranch hand hoping to become a country singer, and Amy Walker (Emily Tennant), the proud and arrogant daughter of a neighbour. Although Jake and Carrie take an immediate liking to each other, there is instant animosity between Carrie and Amy, mainly because Amy also likes Jake.

When Carrie disobeys her father's rules regarding visits to the nearest town, Hank decides to punish Carrie by temporarily relocating Flicka to the farm of one of his ranch hands, Toby (Clint Black). After a midnight visit by Carrie, Flicka tries to follow Carrie home to Hank's ranch, but accidentally ends up on the ranch belonging to Amy's father HD Walker (Ted Whittall). Upon entering the Walker ranch, Flicka damages a fence and releases some of HD's prize cows. At Amy's request, HD asks for Flicka as payment for the damage, threatening to turn it into a lawsuit if Hank refuses. Amy then starts training with Flicka for a championship, but performs poorly during the actual competition because of Flicka's fear of the crowd and camera flashes from the audience. HD and Amy decide to have Flicka slaughtered the next day, but Carrie frees the horse during the night and sets her free to join a nearby herd of Mustangs.

One year later, Carrie, Hank, and Toby are riding in the mountains when they encounter the same herd of Mustangs, including Flicka and her newborn foal.

Cast
 Patrick Warburton as Hank McLaughlin
 Tammin Sursok as Carrie McLaughlin
 Clint Black as Toby
 Emily Tennant as Amy Walker
 Reilly Dolman as Jake
 Ted Whittall as HD Walker
 Craig Stanghetta as Pete
 Dwayne Wiley as Tucker

Soundtrack 

 Musical score by:

References

External links
 
 

2010 direct-to-video films
2010 films
Direct-to-video sequel films
20th Century Fox direct-to-video films
Films directed by Michael Damian
Films about horses
Films based on American novels
American sequel films
Films shot in British Columbia
Films set in Wyoming
Films about father–daughter relationships
2010s English-language films